Leanne Lakey (born May 1978) is a British actress, known for playing Belinda Peacock in EastEnders and Charlotte Day in Family Affairs.

Background
Lakey originally trained to be a dancer, and is accomplished at jazz, ballroom and ballet. She used to play netball for Essex, and considered playing for England.

Lakey studied Dance at the Essex Dance Theatre and went on to train at Arts Educational Schools in Chiswick.

Career
Lakey's first professional acting role was a cameo in the television film The Last Musketeer.

During 2002 she appeared in both EastEnders and Family Affairs at the same time, becoming one of the first actors to do so. Discussing the experience, she said:

"I find I'm under more pressure at Family Affairs, as it's regular. The work schedule at FA is very hard. I'm up at 4.30 every morning and I'm lucky to get home before 9 or 10pm so it's difficult...the main difference is celebrities and fame. On EE they're all household names and they all have their own problems, but the actors on Family Affairs aren't as well known. EE is like a holiday, I get to catch up with everybody which is great. It's very relaxed, whereas Family Affairs, the schedule is so tight it's too quick."

Lakey has also appeared in episodes of Ashes to Ashes, New Tricks, Casualty and The Bill.

In January 2016, actress (Carli Norris) became the second actress to play Belinda Peacock, replacing Lakey.

Filmography

References

External links

Actors from Chelmsford
People educated at the Arts Educational Schools
English soap opera actresses
English television actresses
1979 births
Living people